Aston Villa made a storming start to the 1891–92 English Football League season, winning their first four games and scoring sixteen goals in the process. They eventually finished a much-improved fourth in The Football League and created history by defeating Accrington 12-2 (still a club record for a league game). Bizarrely, Villa didn't draw a single game all season!

It was the FA Cup, however, which retained the most excitement for supporters. Villa dispatched Heanor Town F.C., Darwen, local rivals Wolverhampton Wanderers F.C. and Sunderland to reach their second final at The Oval. Villa were matched against their fierce Warwickshire rivals West Bromwich Albion F.C. in a repeat of Villa's triumphant 1887 FA Cup Final. Unlike in 1887, however, Villa started as strong favourites. They had already comfortably beaten Albion home and away in the league.

It was with some consternation then that the large crowd assembled at Birmingham New Street station to hear the result learned that Villa had been defeated 3–0. After the game rumours circulated that Villa's goalkeeper, Jimmy Warner, had thrown the match. Every window in his pub in Spring Hill, Birmingham was smashed by an angry mob. Despite his probable innocence, Warner was scapegoated and never played for Villa again.

Despite the Cup final heart-break Villa had stumbled upon the nucleus of its most dominant side ever. With stars like James Cowan, Charlie Athersmith and John Devey, Villa were now in a much stronger position to challenge for supremacy of English football.

First Division

FA Cup

External links
avfchistory.co.uk 1891–92 season

Aston Villa F.C. seasons
Aston Villa F.C.